Zsolt Laczkó (born 18 December 1986) is a Hungarian former professional footballer who last played as a left wing back or winger for III. Kerületi TVE.

Club career

Ferencváros
Zsolt Laczkó was born in Szeged, Hungary. He debuted in the Hungarian National Championship I in 2004. He played for Ferencvárosi TC 44 matches and scored 12 goals.

Olympiacos
Laczkó was a free agent and joined Olympiacos's pre-season training. Laczkó was given a trial period in which he played in two friendlies – one of which he scored in – and impressed Olympiacos coach Takis Lemonis enough to be rewarded with a contract with the club. On 25 July 2007, he signed a four-year deal with the club, but was subsequently loaned out to fellow Super League side Levadiakos shortly after signing.

Loan to Leicester City

On 17 December 2007, Laczkó joined Leicester City on trial, and he was signed on loan on 4 January 2008 for the remainder of the season, with the club having the option to buy him for a pre-determined fee. Issued the number 32 shirt, both he and compatriot Gábor Bori (who joined the following week) were keen to earn permanent deals to stay at the club. Laczkó made his debut in a 2–0 win over Coventry City on 12 January, receiving a standing ovation from the home fans when substituted. Then-manager Ian Holloway described him as "absolutely outstanding." Laczkó made his only assist for the club against Norwich City on 16 February, setting up Stephen Clemence's goal in a 4–0 win. He played a total of nine league games as Leicester were relegated at the end of the season; a permanent deal never took place.

Vasas
Laczkó returned to Hungary after failing to establish himself as a first team player with Olympiacos, signing for Vasas SC for whom he played for one season before joining Hungarian champions Debreceni VSC in August 2009.

Debrecen
Laczkó played 35 matches and scored 2 goals in the Hungarian squad of Debreceni VSC. He played six matches in the group stages of the 2009–10 Champions League season with Debreceni VSC. He scored a double against arch-rival Diósgyőri VTK in the 2009–10 season. He won the Hungarian National Championship I with Debreceni VSC in 2010. He played and important role in the qualification of the 2010–11 Europa League season in the squad. He scored a goal against Litex in the play-off round. He also performed well against Sampdoria in the Stadio Luigi Ferraris, however Debreceni VSC lost 1–0. In the last round of the 2010–11 Europa League Debreceni VSC beat Sampdoria 2–0.

Sampdoria

In January 2011 Zsolt Laczkó signed a contract with Italian Serie A team Sampdoria.

Ferencváros
On 22 February 2014, Laczkó was signed by the Hungarian League club Ferencvárosi TC.

International career
Laczkó was part of the U21 squad that played in the 2009 UEFA European Under-21 Football Championship qualification, making five appearances as Hungary failed to qualify for the finals. His last appearance for the under-21 was a 1–0 away defeat to Latvia on 18 November 2007. Laczkó made his national team debut as a substitute in a 3–0 friendly defeat to Germany in Budapest on 29 May 2010.

Career statistics

Honours
Ferencváros
Hungarian National Championship I: runner-up 2004–05
Hungarian Cup: runner-up 2004–05

Debrecen
Hungarian National Championship I: 2009–10
Hungarian Cup: 2009–10
Hungarian Super Cup: 2010
Hungarian League Cup: 2010

References

External links

1986 births
Living people
Sportspeople from Szeged
Hungarian footballers
Hungary under-21 international footballers
Hungary international footballers
Association football defenders
Ferencvárosi TC footballers
Olympiacos F.C. players
Levadiakos F.C. players
Leicester City F.C. players
Vasas SC players
Debreceni VSC players
U.C. Sampdoria players
L.R. Vicenza players
Calcio Padova players
Kecskeméti TE players
III. Kerületi TUE footballers
Nemzeti Bajnokság I players
Super League Greece players
Serie A players
Serie B players
Hungarian expatriate footballers
Expatriate footballers in Greece
Expatriate footballers in England
Expatriate footballers in Italy
Hungarian expatriate sportspeople in Greece
Hungarian expatriate sportspeople in England
Hungarian expatriate sportspeople in Italy